Khalef may refer to:

 Stade Abdelkader Khalef, a stadium that is being constructed in Tizi Ouzou, Algeria

People with the surname
 Mahieddine Khalef (born 1944), Algerian football manager
 Omar Mahmoud Khalef (born 1990), Iraqi football striker

See also
 Khalaf (disambiguation)

Arabic-language surnames